Wavoora is a village in Kupwara district of the Indian union territory of Jammu and Kashmir.

Demographics
According to the 2011 census of India, Wavoora has 401 households. The literacy rate of Wavoora village was 68.15% compared to 67.16% of Jammu and Kashmir. In Wavoora, Male literacy stands at 77.13% while the female literacy rate was 59.03%.

Transport

Road
Wavoora village is connected by road with other places in Jammu and Kashmir and India by the Wavoora-Kuligam Road.

Rail
The nearest railway stations to Wavoora are Sopore railway station and Baramulla railway station located at a distance of 54 and 60 kilometres respectively.

Air
The nearest airport is Srinagar International Airport located at a distance of 106 kilometres and is a 3-hour drive.

See also
 Jammu and Kashmir
 Lolab Valley
 Kupwara

References

Villages in Kupwara district